Wayne Neville Rittmuller (born 18 June 1982) is a South African international lawn bowler and three times national champion of South Africa. He has represented South Africa at the Commonwealth Games.

Biography
Rittmuller started playing bowls aged 12 and played for Wentworth Bowling Club from 2001 to 2005. He won the South African national singles title two years in succession in 2017 and 2018 at the South African National Bowls Championships, when bowling for Stella Park (Port Natal). In 2022, he won his third title but this time in the pairs with Jason Lott for the Hillary BC.

In 2022, he was selected for the 2022 Commonwealth Games in Birmingham where he competed in the men's pairs event and the men's fours event.

References

1982 births
Living people
South African male bowls players
Bowls players at the 2022 Commonwealth Games
Commonwealth Games competitors for South Africa